Subiakro is a village in central Ivory Coast. It is in the sub-prefecture of Yamoussoukro in the Yamoussoukro Department of the Autonomous District of Yamoussoukro. It is located five kilometres south of the outskirts of Yamoussoukro city.

Subiakro was a commune until March 2012, when it became one of 1126 communes nationwide that were abolished.

Notes

Former communes of Ivory Coast
Populated places in Yamoussoukro